Robert Frederick Sholl (27 August 1848 – 4 December 1909) was an entrepreneur and a member of the Parliament of Western Australia. His business interests included pearling vessels, real estate and mining. Sholl was also a representative at the Australasian Federal Convention of 1897.

He was the son of Government Resident Robert John Sholl (1819–86) and Mary Ann Sholl née Berckelman (1822–89). Three brothers of Robert Frederick Sholl were also notable: Trevarton Sholl (1845–1867), Richard Adolphus Sholl (1847–1919) and Horatio William (Horace) Sholl (1852–1927).

Bibliography
Bolton, GC, "Sholl, Robert Frederick (1848–1909)", Australian Dictionary of Biography [online ed.] (25 September 2012).

1848 births
1909 deaths
Settlers of Western Australia
Members of the Western Australian Legislative Assembly
People from the Pilbara
Pearlers
19th-century Australian politicians